Renoly Santiago (born March 15, 1974) is a Puerto Rican actor, singer and writer known for his appearances in films such as Dangerous Minds, Hackers and Con Air, and in television series such as Touched by an Angel and Law & Order: Criminal Intent.

Early life
Renoly Santiago was born in Lajas, Puerto Rico. He was raised in Union City, New Jersey.

Career
Santiago first became known in the United States when he was cast in the 1993 television series CityKids as Tito. He co-wrote the Emmy nominated pilot episode of the show. From his participation in CityKids, Santiago graduated to film, acting as Raúl Sanchero in 1995's Dangerous Minds. By 1996, he was co-starring alongside some other well-known Hollywood actors in his role as Ramόn Sánchez, a.k.a. the "Phantom Phreak" in Hackers. He also plays Mikey in Daylight.

Santiago starred as Ramón Martínez, a transgender criminal nicknamed "Sally-Can't Dance", in the 1997 film Con Air. Santiago then took three years off from acting on-screen and starred on Broadway in Paul Simon's The Capeman as Tony "Umbrella Man" Hernandez, leader of the gang The Vampires, a role for which he was a 1998 Drama Desk Nominee for Outstanding Featured Actor in a Musical.

As a singer, Santiago has recorded with performers Marc Anthony, Paul Simon, Danny Rivera and La India.

In 2000, he returned to the screen in the low-budget film Punks, in which he plays Dante, which was shown at the Sundance Film Festival. By 2001, Santiago was back on television, playing Miguel Acosta in the January 7 episode of Touched by an Angel, making a small appearance in the March 29 episode of Big Apple and as Chiggy Rios in Law & Order: Criminal Intent in the episode "The Faithful'.

In 2002, Santiago made a film called The Street King, where he played the character Cesar Rojas. It was not a major hit, and Santiago took another three-year sabbatical from screen acting. Santiago returned to film in 2005, as "Scorpio" in Just Another Romantic Wrestling Comedy. In early 2011, he starred as Johnny Pacheco in the Hector Lavoe salsa biopic The King. Santiago will appear in Grand Street in which he stars with Kelly McGillis.

From March 6 to May 8, 2014 Santiago taught professional acting classes at The William V. Musto Cultural Center in his boyhood home of Union City, New Jersey. The ten-week course was initiated as part of the Grace Theatre Workshop, and consisted of monologue and scene studies.

Personal life
Santiago lives in New York City.

Filmography

See also
List of Puerto Ricans

References

External links

 Myspace profile
 Official Website

1974 births
Living people
American male film actors
American male television actors
Puerto Rican male actors
People from Lajas, Puerto Rico
People from Union City, New Jersey
Male actors from New York City